{{Infobox official post
| post                     = United KingdomOffice of the Permanent Secretary of the Admiralty
| flag                     = Flag of the British Secretary of State for Defence.svg
| flagsize                 = 150px
| flagcaption              = Flag of the Secretary of the Admiralty
| insignia                 = Royal Coat of Arms of the United Kingdom (HM Government).svg
| insigniasize             = 120px
| insigniacaption          = Royal Arms as used by Her Majesty's Government
| image                    = Sir Henry Vaughan Markham, 19 August 1943 IWM A 18733.jpg
| imagecaption             = Sir Henry V. Markham, Permanent Secretary, 1940–1946
| incumbent                = 
| incumbentsince           = 
| appointer           = The British Monarchon advice of the Prime Minister
| style                    = The Right Honourable(Formal prefix)Second Secretary to the Admiralty| member_of                = British CabinetBoard of Admiralty
| department               = Admiralty Department
| reports_to               = 
|seat                      = Westminster, London
|The British Monarchon advice of the Prime Minister
| termlength               = No fixed term
| formation                = 1702-1964
| first                    = George Clarke
| last                     = Clifford Jarrett
| website                  = 
}}

The Permanent Secretary of the Admiralty was the permanent secretary at the Admiralty, the department of state in Great Britain responsible for the administration of the Royal Navy. He was head of the Admiralty Secretariat, later known as the Department of the Permanent Secretary.  Although he was not a Lord Commissioner of the Admiralty, he was as a member of the Board, and did attend all meetings. The post existed from 1702 to 1964.

History
The office originally evolved from the Assistants to the Secretary of the Admiralty (later called the First Secretary) who were initially only intermittently appointed, being sometimes designated "joint secretary" and sometimes "deputy secretary". Appointments became regular from 1756, and the title of the office was established as Second Secretary to the Admiralty' on 13 January 1783. In the 19th century, it increasingly became the case that the First Secretary of the Admiralty was a member of the Government, while the Second Secretary was a civil servant, and the titles of the offices were changed to reflect this in 1869, the First Secretary becoming the Parliamentary Secretary of the Admiralty and the Second Secretary the Permanent Secretary of the Admiralty.
When the Admiralty Department was abolished in 1964 and its functions merged within a new Ministry of Defence the post holder became formally known as the Permanent Under Secretary of State for the Navy.

Duties
He was primarily responsible for the interrelationships and office organization of the various departments that serve the Royal Navy. He assumed the role Secretary to the Board, his chief responsibility was to examine thoroughly all questions involving expenditures and to advise the Board as to the possibility of savings where possible.

Office-holders
Assistant Secretary
 George Clarke, joint secretary, 20 May 1702 to 25 October 1705.

Deputy Secretary
Included: 
 John Fawler, 15 November 1705 to 11 November 1714
 Thomas Corbett, 25 June 1728 to 13 October 1742 
 Robert Osborn, 17 November 1744 to 1 August 1746
 John Clevland, 4 August 1746 to 1 May 1751
 John Milnes, 15 June 1756 to 16 October 1759
 Philip Stephens, 16 October 1759 to 18 June 1763.
 Charles Fearne, 28 June 1764 to 10 November 1766.
 George Jackson, 11 November 1766 to 12 June 1782.
 John Ibbetson, from 12 June 1782 to 13 January 1783.

Second Secretary
Title established as Second Secretary in January 1783.
 John Ibbetson, from 31 January 1783
 William Marsden, from 3 March 1795
 Benjamin Tucker, from 21 January 1804
 John Barrow, from 22 May 1804
 Benjamin Tucker, from 10 February 1806
 Sir John Barrow, from 9 April 1807
 William Baillie-Hamilton, from 28 April 1845
 Thomas Phinn, from 22 May 1855
 William Govett Romaine, from 7 May 1857 to 19 June 1869

Permanent Secretary
In 1869 the office was renamed Permanent Secretary of the Admiralty. 
 Vernon Lushington, from 1869 to 1877.
The office was abolished in 1877 and the duties merged with those of the Naval Secretary.

Naval Secretary
New post established in 1872.
 Rear-Admiral Robert Hall, from 1872 to 1882.
The post was abolished in 1882 when that of Permanent Secretary was re-established.

Permanent Secretary
 Robert George Crookshank Hamilton, from May 1882
 Vice-Admiral Robert Hall, acting during Hamilton's absence in Ireland, 1882
 Captain George Tryon, from 13 June 1882.
 Sir Evan Macgregor, from 2 April 1884
 Sir Inigo Thomas, from 1 April 1907.
 Sir Graham Greene, 1911–1917
 Sir Oswyn Murray, 1917–1936
 Sir Richard Carter, 1936–1940
 Sir Henry Markham, 1940–1946
 Sir John Lang, 1947–1961
 Sir Clifford Jarrett, 1961–1964

See also
 Parliamentary and Financial Secretary to the Admiralty
 Board of Admiralty
 Admiralty

References

Sources
 
 "Permanent Secretary to the Board of Admiralty."  The Dreadnought Project''.

Secretaries of the Royal Navy
Civil service positions in the United Kingdom
Admiralty during World War II